Ashburton County was one of the counties of New Zealand in the South Island. The council first met on 4 January 1877 in the Ashburton Road Board office. It became part of Ashburton District Council in 1989, together with Ashburton Borough Council.

See also 
 List of former territorial authorities in New Zealand § Counties

References

Counties of New Zealand
Politics of Canterbury, New Zealand
Ashburton, New Zealand